KMSE (88.7 FM) is a radio station licensed to Rochester, Minnesota. The station is owned by Minnesota Public Radio (MPR), and airs MPR's "The Current" network, consisting of an Adult Album Alternative music format originating from KCMP in Northfield, Minnesota.

See also Minnesota Public Radio

External links
KMSE page at Minnesota Public Radio
thecurrent.org

Radio stations in Minnesota
Minnesota Public Radio
NPR member stations